Olorunda is a Local Government Area in Osun State, Nigeria. Its headquarters are in Igbona, on the outskirts of the state capital Osogbo.

It has an area of 97 km and a population of 131,761 at the 2006 census.

The postal code of the area is 230.

References

Local Government Areas in Osun State